Anne Quemere (born May 19, 1966) is a French sailor and sportswoman.

Biography
From an early age, she found herself close to the sea on which she sails, as a family living in the Glénan archipelago, on the islands of Groix, Belle-Île, Houat or Hœdic. Her father was a sailor. She was the third among three sisters and a brother.)

After her high school diploma, she went to the Fac de Rennes and then in the 90s she flew to the United States where she settled. Residing in New Orleans (Louisiana), Vermont and New York, she works in tourism, day after day traveling the North American continent, Mexico, Asia and India. In the early 2000s, she returned to Brittany and began new activities.

Ocean crossings

2002-2004: Atlantic and solo records
In 2002, after two years of meticulous preparation, she rowed across the Atlantic following the easterlies route. Starting from the island of Gomera in the Canary Islands, she arrived in Guadeloupe 56 days later, thus establishing the new female record held until then by the American Tori Murden.

In 2004, she set off from Cape Cod in the United States, rowing and solo, to reach the French coast, which she set foot on 86 days later, having covered some 6,450 km. This trip was for her, the opportunity to claim a new female record.

2006: the North Atlantic by kite 
In June 2006, she left New York aboard a small prototype 6 meters long towed by a kite, also called a traction wing or controllable kite. Alone and non-stop, she arrived on the island of Ushant (Brittany coast) at the end of her trip, 55 days later. This crossing was a world first.

2008-2011: Pacific and mission in Greenland
In November 2008, she tried to cross the Pacific aboard her prototype, called a kiteboat, from San Francisco to Tahiti. This time things were not so easy. "I was stuck for 4 weeks at sea. Communications were cut. Later a cargo vessel rescued me." She was rescued safe and sound by a cargo ship that left China and was headed for New York.

During the summer of 2010, she flew to southeastern Greenland and joined an expedition called "La Grande Dérive" in Tasiilaq, whose mission is scientific and the objective is raising public awareness of the fragility of the ice floe. In the company of Emmanuel Hussenet, Luc Dénoyer and Gauthier Mesnil-Blanc, she drifted on ice floes and traveled in a kayak for 6 weeks, completely alone.

In March 2011, she set off from the port of Callao (Peru) for a solo crossing of the Pacific aboard her kiteboat Adrien whose only driving force was a traction wing. Despite some technical problems and a radio silence of two months (following a failure of her satellite phone) she completed her journey of approximately 7,000 km in 78 days. She landed on the island of Makemo, one of the largest atolls of the Tuamotu in French Polynesia in May 2011 before joining Papeete. This Pacific crossing was a world first.

2014-2018: Northwest Passage
In June 2014, she returned to the Arctic and attempted to cross the Northwest Passage by kayak and solo. But the ice blocked her way and she was forced to give up her journey.

In 2015, she, along with Raphaël Domjan, attempted to make the first crossing of the Northwest Passage in a solar powered kayak. Unfortunately, the weather conditions were unfavorable and they had to turn back after 300 km. The expedition nevertheless constitutes the first solar polar navigation in history.

A book recounting these two journeys came out on March 11, 2016 (Passagère de l'Arctique, ed. Locus Solus).

During the summer of 2018, she tried the Northwest Passage again, aboard a solar boat, this time with better weather conditions. She had to give up before it could be completed, but drew from the experience a documentary of the same name as her previous book.

References

External links
 official website

French explorers
Sportspeople from Quimper
1966 births
Living people
French female sailors (sport)
20th-century French women
21st-century French women